W class may refer to:

W-class Melbourne tram, a family of electric trams
W-class destroyer (disambiguation), several classes of ships
Victorian Railways W class, diesel-hydraulic shunting locomotives
WAGR W class, a class of Western Australian steam locomotive
A code used by some airlines for premium economy

See also 
 Class W